"Cash Machine" is a song by Hard-Fi.

Cash Machine may also refer to:

"Cash Machine" (D.R.A.M. song)
An automated teller machine